The Judge Columbia Lancaster House is a large house on the National Register of Historic Places in Ridgefield, Washington in the Southern Colonial style. Constructed from 1850 to 1855, it is named for Columbia Lancaster and is one of the oldest frame houses in Washington State.

References

Houses in Clark County, Washington
National Register of Historic Places in Clark County, Washington